Hasdrubal the Fair (ʿAzrobaʿl; –221BC) was a Carthaginian military leader and politician, governor in Iberia after Hamilcar Barca's death, and founder of Cartagena.

Family
Livy's History of Rome records that Hasdrubal was the brother-in-law of the Carthaginian leader Hannibal and son-in-law of Hamilcar Barca.

Career
Hasdrubal followed Hamilcar in his campaign against the governing aristocracy at Carthage at the close of the First Punic War, and in his subsequent career of conquest in Hispania. In 237 BC, they parted towards the Peninsula, but around 231–230 BC Hasdrubal allegedly interceded in Hamilcar's name to make the Numidian tribes from northern Africa submit to the Barcid family, and Numidia soon fell into Carthage's sphere of influence.

After Hamilcar's death in 228 BC, while he was fighting Iberian tribes, Hasdrubal succeeded him in command and followed orders from Carthage since Hamilcar's sons were too young. Hannibal, the elder, was 19 at the time. Unlike his predecessor, Hasdrubal largely preferred diplomacy over military campaigns. In accordance with the common diplomatic customs of the time, Hasdrubal demanded hostages from the realms who bent the knee to Carthage to dissuade them from breaking their treaties.

Thus, he extended the territory by skillful diplomacy and consolidating it by founding the important city and naval base of Qart Hadasht, which the Romans later called Carthago Nova (Cartagena) as the capital of the new province, and by establishing a treaty with the Roman Republic which cemented the River Ebro (the classical Iberus) as the boundary between the two powers. This treaty was caused by a Greek colony, Ampurias, and Iberian Sagunto, fearful of the continuous growth of Punic power in Iberia, asking Rome for help. Hasdrubal accepted reluctantly, as Punic dominion in Iberia was not yet sufficiently established to jeopardise its future expansion in a premature conflict.

Death
Seven years after Hamilcar's death, Hasdrubal the Fair was assassinated in 221 BC by a slave of the Celtic king Tagus, who thus avenged the death of his own master.

Hasdrubal's successor was his brother-in-law and the son of Hamilcar, Hannibal Barca.

See also
 Other Hasdrubals in Carthaginian history

References

Citations

Bibliography
 .  
 Diodorus of Sicily: History 
 Appian: Roman History. Biblioteca Clásica Gredos 84 (in Spanish).
 Polybius: Histories. Biblioteca Clásica Gredos 38 y 43 (in Spanish).
 Titus Livius: History of Rome. Libro de Bolsillo Alianza Editorial 1595 1–2 (in Spanish).

External links 
 Livius.org: Hasdrubal the Fair 

270s BC births
221 BC deaths
Barcids
City founders
History of Cartagena, Spain
3rd-century BC Punic people